Hubert James Cartwright (August 22, 1900 – March 6, 1958) was an American prelate of the Roman Catholic Church who served as Coadjutor Bishop of the Diocese of Wilmington, Delaware from 1956 to 1958.

Biography
Born in Philadelphia, Pennsylvania, United States, Cartwright grew up there and attended St. Charles Borromeo Seminary. He was ordained a priest for the Roman Catholic Archdiocese of Philadelphia on June 11, 1927.

In 1936, Father Cartwright became rector of the Cathedral Basilica of Ss. Peter and Paul, Philadelphia, where he supervised a major renovation.

In 1956, he was assigned coadjutor bishop of Wilmington with the right of succeeding the incumbent bishop, Edmond John Fitzmaurice, in the event of the latter's resignation or death.

On August 3, 1956, Cartwright was appointed titular bishop of Neve (Nebo).

Death
Bishop Cartwright died on March 6, 1958, aged 57, while still coadjutor.

References

People from Wilmington, Delaware
Clergy from Philadelphia
1900 births
1958 deaths
20th-century Roman Catholic bishops in the United States
Catholics from Delaware